Supercard of Honor IX was the 9th Supercard of Honor professional wrestling live event produced by Ring of Honor (ROH), which took place on March 27, 2015 at The Sports House in Redwood City, California.

Storylines
This professional wrestling event features eight professional wrestling matches, which involve different wrestlers from pre-existing scripted feuds, plots, and storylines that played out on ROH's television programs. Wrestlers portrayed villains or heroes as they followed a series of events that built tension and culminated in a wrestling match or series of matches.

Talent from  New Japan Pro-Wrestling (NJPW), with whom ROH has a talent exchange agreement, also appeared at the event.

At 13th Anniversary Samoa Joe returned to Ring of Honor in his first appearance since 2008. Samoa Joe came out and cut a promo laying claim to the ROH World Heavyweight Championship, challenging World Champion, Jay Briscoe in the process.

On March 28 addition of Ring of Honor television, The Decade members B. J. Whitmer and Adam Page came out to the ring and cut a promo on Steve Corino making it seem like they wanted him to join them. When Steve grabbed the mic. and said he would not join the Decade, Whitmer said, we weren't talking about you. They then point to Corino's son, Colby Corino. Colby gets in the ring and joins the Decade. Jimmy Jacobs ran out and tried to neutralize the situation and ends up sending The Decade out of the ring. He proceeds to comfort Steve  Corino, signaling the end of Jacobs' alliance in the Decade.

Jacobs announced on Twitter that he will be on the creative team for WWE. This was Jacobs' last match in ROH before departing for WWE.

Results

References

2015 in professional wrestling
Professional wrestling in California
2015 in California
Events in California
ROH Supercard of Honor
March 2015 events in the United States